A Jewish quota was a discriminatory racial quota designed to limit or deny access for Jews to various institutions. Such quotas were widespread in the 19th and 20th centuries in developed countries and frequently present in higher education, often at prestigious universities.

By countries

Canada

Some universities in Canada, notably McGill University, Université de Montréal and the University of Toronto Faculty of Medicine, had longstanding quotas on the number of Jews admitted to the respective universities. McGill University’s strict quota was the longest-running, having been officially adopted in 1920 and remaining in place until the late 1960s.

Germany

In Germany, a whole series of numerus clausus resolutions were adopted in 1929 on the basis of race and place of origin, not religion.

On 25 April 1933, the Nazi government introduced a 1.5% quota for new admissions of German non-Aryans—ie., essentially of German Jews—as core issue of a law claiming to generally limit the number of (Aryan and non-Aryan) students admitted to high-schools (höhere Schulen) and universities. In addition, high-schools and universities deemed to have more students than required for the professions for which they were training their students were required to reduce their student enrollment; in doing so, they had to reach a maximum of 5% of German non-Aryan students. The law was supposedly enacted to avoid overcrowding schools and universities, which cited apparent concerns at the time that large numbers of students would decrease the quality of higher education in Germany. At the beginning of 1933, about 0.76% of the German population was Jewish, but more than 3.6% of German university students were Jewish, this number having steadily declined from over 9% in the 1880s. After 30 July 1939, Jews were no longer permitted to attend German public schools at all, and the prior quota law was eliminated by a non-public regulation in January 1940.p. 193

In addition to their strong and predominantly antisemitic agenda, the law and subsequent regulations were temporarily used to limit general university access to other groups that were not deemed "non-Aryan", as the name of the law implied. Starting in 1934, a regulation limited the overall numbers of students admitted to German universities, and a special quota was introduced reducing women's admissions to a maximum of 10%. Although the limits were not entirely enforced, the women's quota stayed a bit above 10% mainly because a smaller percentage of men than women accepted their university admissions, which made it approximately twice as hard for women to enter a university career than for men with the same qualification.S. 80ff. After two semesters, these admission limits were revoked, however, leaving in place the non-Aryan regulations.p. 178

Hungary

The Numerus Clausus Act was introduced in 1920, under the government of Pál Teleki. It was said that the ethnic makeup of student bodies must meet the ethnic rate of population. Limitations were relaxed in 1928. Racial criteria in admitting new students were removed and replaced by social criteria. Five categories were set up: civil servants, war veterans and army officers, small landowners and artisans, industrialists, and the merchant classes.

Poland

See Numerus clausus in Poland and Ghetto benches.

Romania

Numerus Clausus was not introduced by law, but it was adopted by students in the universities Cluj, Bucharest, Iasi and Cernauti.

Russia

Numerus Clausus was enacted in 1887, stating that the share of Jewish students should be no more than 10 percent in cities where Jews were allowed to live, 5 percent in other cities, and only 3 percent in Moscow and St. Petersburg. These limitations were removed in the spring of 1917 after the tsar's abdication during the early phase of the Russian revolution of 1917–1918 (the so-called February Revolution of 1917); later, in the late 1940s, during the initial phase of the Cold War and the tide of the anti-"rootless cosmopolitan" campaign, a de facto gross discrimination of Jewish applicants was reintroduced in many institutions of higher education in the Soviet Union until Perestroika.

United States

Certain private universities, most notably Harvard, introduced policies which effectively placed a quota on the number of Jews admitted to the university. Abbott Lawrence Lowell, the president of Harvard University from 1909-1933, raised the alarm about a ‘Jewish problem’ when the number of Jewish students grew from six percent to twenty-two percent from 1908 - 1922.  Lowell then preceded to argue in favor of a "limit be placed on the number of them who later be admitted to the university." However, this implementation of a quota on the number of Jews was not unique to Harvard. After Harvard’s 1926 announcement about instating a "new admissions policy [that] would place great emphasis on character and personality [,T]he Yale Daily News praised its decision and put forward its very own version of how Yale should select its students in a major editorial, ‘Ellis Island for Yale.’ It called on the university to institute immigration laws more prohibitive than those of the United States government." According to historian David Oshinsky, writing about Jonas Salk, "Most of the surrounding medical schools (Cornell, Columbia, Pennsylvania, and Yale) had rigid quotas in place. In 1935 Yale accepted 76 applicants from a pool of 501. About 200 of those applicants were Jewish and only five got in." He notes that Dean Milton Winternitz's instructions were remarkably precise: "Never admit more than five Jews, and take no blacks at all." As a result, Oshinsky added, "Jonas Salk and hundreds like him" enrolled in New York University instead. Physicist and Nobel laureate Richard P. Feynman was turned away from Columbia College in the 1930s and went to MIT instead.

According to Dan Oren's book, Joining the Club — A History of Jews and Yale, Yale University's informal admissions policy to restrict the school's Jewish student body to around 10 percent ended in the early 1960s.

Yugoslavia

In 1940, the government of the Kingdom of Yugoslavia enacted the Decree on the Enrollment of Persons of Jewish Descent at the University, Secondary School, Teacher Training College and Other Vocational Schools which limited the proportion of Jewish students to the proportion of Jews in the total population.

See also

 Asian quota
 Disabilities (Jewish)
 Reservation in India

References

Antisemitism in the United States
Disabilities (Jewish)
Education controversies
Education policy
History of education
Quotas
Race and education in the United States